Swartruggens is a small farming town in North West Province, South Africa that was established in 1875.

Location
The town is located by the Elands River, 69 km from the town of Zeerust, 56 km west of the city of Rustenburg and 34 km north-west of Koster.

It takes its name 'Swartruggens' from a series of hills there, formerly known as Zwartruggens, a Dutch name for 'black ridges'.

History
The town of Swartruggens was founded in 1875 on the farm Brakfontein.

After the Siege of Mafeking, during the Second Anglo-Boer War, one of the supply depots established by Robert Baden-Powell as he moved towards Pretoria was in Swartruggens.

A cemetery for British war dead from the Second Anglo-Boer War is located in the town.

References

External links
The Siege of the Elandsriver Staging Post 4 - 16 August 1900

Populated places in the Kgetlengrivier Local Municipality
Populated places established in 1875